Garnia is a genus of parasitic alveolates belonging to the phylum Apicomplexia.

History

The genus was created in 1971 by Lainson et al.

Description

Ulike members of the Plasmodiidae and Haemoproteidae, species in this genus do not produce pigment when developing in the erythrocytes.

Species in this genus are distinguished from members of the Leucocytozoidae by their schizogony in the red and white cells of the peripheral blood.

The vectors of this genus are not known but it is suspected that phlebotomine sandflies may act in this regard.

The type species is Garnia gonatodi.

Hosts

Species in this genus infect lizards.

Geographic distribution

This genus has been described in South America.

References

Apicomplexa genera
Parasites of lizards
Haemosporida